Saint-Germain-sur-Eaulne is a commune in the Seine-Maritime department in the Normandy region in northern France.

Geography
The Amiens branch of the A29 autoroute starts within the commune's borders, at Junction 7 with the A28 autoroute.

Population

Places of interest
 The church of St. Germain, dating from the seventeenth century.
 The ruins of a seventeenth-century chateau.

See also
Communes of the Seine-Maritime department

References

Communes of Seine-Maritime